Agrotis araucaria is a moth of the family Noctuidae. It is found in the Concepción region of Chile as well as the Neuquén Province of Argentina.

The wingspan is 40–44 mm. Adults are on wing from November to December.

External links
 Noctuinae of Chile

Agrotis
Moths of South America
Moths described in 1903